The Ivy League Women's Soccer Player of the Year was an annual award presented by the Ivy League from 1981–2012 to the best player in the conference.

Starting in 2013, the Ivy League presents awards for both Offensive Player of the Year and Defensive Player of the Year.

Ivy League Women's Soccer Player of the Year

Player of the Year (1981–1989)

Player of the Year (1990–1999) 

Unanimous selection.

Player of the Year (2000–2009)

Player of the Year (2010–2012) 

Unanimous selection.

Ivy League Offensive Player of the Year

Offensive Player of the Year (2013–2019) 

Unanimous selection.
The Ivy League did not sponsor any competition during the 2020-2021 academic year due to the COVID-19 pandemic.

Ivy League Defensive Player of the Year

Defensive Player of the Year (2013–2019) 

Unanimous selection.
The Ivy League did not sponsor any competition during the 2020-2021 academic year due to the COVID-19 pandemic.

References 

Most valuable player awards
Sports trophies and awards